A black hole bomb is the name given to a physical effect utilizing how a bosonic field impinging on a rotating black hole can be amplified through superradiant scattering. If the amplified field is reflected back towards the black hole, the amplification can be repeated, leading to a run-away growth of the field, i.e. an explosion. One way this reflection could be realized in nature is if the bosonic field has mass. The mass of the field can then cause the amplified modes to be trapped around the black hole, leading to an endless cycle of self-amplification. The mechanism by which the black hole bomb functions is called superradiant instability. It can also refer to one such method of creating such a runaway effect, a Penrose sphere with no means for energy to passively escape.

History
The idea that angular momentum and energy may be transferred from a rotating black hole to a particle being scattered by it was proposed by Roger Penrose in 1971. The first discussion of a runaway effect, the black hole bomb, was explored by W. H. Press and S. A. Teukolsky in 1972. If such an effect were to spontaneously occur, it may point to new physics beyond the Standard Model, and showing that black holes have "hair", as pointed out by a paper from 2017, by William E. East and Frans Pretorius.

See also
 Superradiance
 Penrose process

References

Further reading

External links
 Helvi Witek, Ole Miss News, University of Mississippi (12 October 2012)
 

 Black holes
 Energy sources